Absinthe is an anise-flavoured spirit derived from several plants, including the flowers and leaves of Artemisia absinthium ("grand wormwood"), together with green anise, sweet fennel, and other medicinal and culinary herbs. Historically described as a highly alcoholic spirit, it is 45–74% ABV or 90–148 proof US. Absinthe traditionally has a natural green color but may also be colorless. It is sometimes mistakenly referred to as a liqueur, but is not traditionally bottled with added sugar, so is classified as a spirit. Absinthe is traditionally bottled at a high level of alcohol by volume, but it is normally diluted with water before being consumed.

Absinthe originated in the canton of Neuchâtel in Switzerland in the late 18th century. It rose to great popularity as an alcoholic drink in late 19th- and early 20th-century France, particularly among Parisian artists and writers. The consumption of absinthe was opposed by social conservatives and prohibitionists, partly due to its association with bohemian culture. From Europe and the Americas, notable absinthe drinkers included Ernest Hemingway, James Joyce, Lewis Carroll, Charles Baudelaire, Paul Verlaine, Arthur Rimbaud, Henri de Toulouse-Lautrec, Amedeo Modigliani, Pablo Picasso, Vincent van Gogh, Oscar Wilde, Marcel Proust, Aleister Crowley, Erik Satie, Edgar Allan Poe, Lord Byron, and Alfred Jarry.

Absinthe has often been portrayed as a dangerously addictive psychoactive drug and hallucinogen. The chemical compound thujone, which is present in the spirit in trace amounts, was blamed for its alleged harmful effects. By 1915, absinthe had been banned in the United States and in much of Europe, including France, the Netherlands, Belgium, Switzerland, and Austria-Hungary, yet it has not been demonstrated to be any more dangerous than ordinary spirits. Recent studies have shown that absinthe's psychoactive properties (apart from those attributable to alcohol) have been exaggerated.

A revival of absinthe began in the 1990s, following the adoption of modern European Union food and beverage laws that removed long-standing barriers to its production and sale. By the early 21st century, nearly 200 brands of absinthe were being produced in a dozen countries, most notably in France, Switzerland, Austria, Germany, the Netherlands, Spain, and the Czech Republic.

Etymology

The French word absinthe can refer either to the alcoholic beverage, or less commonly, to the actual wormwood plant. Absinthe is derived from the Latin absinthium, which in turn comes from the Greek  apsínthion, "wormwood". The use of Artemisia absinthium in a drink is attested in Lucretius' De Rerum Natura (936–950), where Lucretius indicates that a drink containing wormwood is given as medicine to children in a cup with honey on the brim to make it drinkable. Some claim that the word means "undrinkable" in Greek, but it may instead be linked to the Persian root spand or aspand, or the variant esfand, which meant Peganum harmala, also called Syrian rue, although it is not actually a variety of rue, another famously bitter herb. That Artemisia absinthium was commonly burned as a protective offering may suggest that its origins lie in the reconstructed Proto-Indo-European language root *spend, meaning "to perform a ritual" or "make an offering". Whether the word was a borrowing from Persian into Greek, or from a common ancestor of both, is unclear. Alternatively, the Greek word may originate in a pre-Greek substrate  word, marked by the non-Indo-European consonant complex νθ (-nth). Alternative spellings for absinthe include absinth, absynthe, and absenta. Absinth (without the final e) is a spelling variant most commonly applied to absinthes produced in central and eastern Europe, and is specifically associated with Bohemian-style absinthes.

History
The precise origin of absinthe is unclear. The medical use of wormwood dates back to ancient Egypt and is mentioned in the Ebers Papyrus, around 1550 BC. Wormwood extracts and wine-soaked wormwood leaves were used as remedies by the ancient Greeks. Moreover, some evidence exists of a wormwood-flavoured wine in ancient Greece called absinthites oinos.

The first evidence of absinthe, in the sense of a distilled spirit containing green anise and fennel, dates to the 18th century. According to popular legend, it began as an all-purpose patent remedy created by Dr. Pierre Ordinaire, a French doctor living in Couvet, Switzerland, around 1792 (the exact date varies by account). Ordinaire's recipe was passed on to the Henriod sisters of Couvet, who sold it as a medicinal elixir. By other accounts, the Henriod sisters may have been making the elixir before Ordinaire's arrival. In either case, a certain Major Dubied acquired the formula from the sisters in 1797 and opened the first absinthe distillery named Dubied Père et Fils in Couvet with his son Marcellin and son-in-law Henry-Louis Pernod. In 1805, they built a second distillery in Pontarlier, France, under the company name Maison Pernod Fils. Pernod Fils remained one of the most popular brands of absinthe until the drink was banned in France in 1914.

Growth of consumption

Absinthe's popularity grew steadily through the 1840s, when it was given to French troops as a malaria preventive, and the troops brought home their taste for it. Absinthe became so popular in bars, bistros, cafés, and cabarets by the 1860s that the hour of 5 pm was called l'heure verte ("the green hour"). It was favoured by all social classes, from the wealthy bourgeoisie to poor artists and ordinary working-class people. By the 1880s, mass production had caused the price to drop sharply, and the French were drinking 36 million litres per year by 1910, compared to their annual consumption of almost 5 billion litres of wine.

Absinthe was exported widely from France and Switzerland and attained some degree of popularity in other countries, including Spain, the United Kingdom, the United States, and the Czech Republic. It was never banned in Spain or Portugal, and its production and consumption have never ceased. It gained a temporary spike in popularity there during the early 20th century, corresponding with the Art Nouveau and Modernism aesthetic movements.

New Orleans has a cultural association with absinthe and is credited as the birthplace of the Sazerac, perhaps the earliest absinthe cocktail. The Old Absinthe House bar on Bourbon Street began selling absinthe in the first half of the 19th century. Its Catalan lease-holder, Cayetano Ferrer, named it the Absinthe Room in 1874 due to of the popularity of the drink, which was served in the Parisian style. It was frequented by Mark Twain, Oscar Wilde, Franklin Delano Roosevelt, Aleister Crowley, and Frank Sinatra.

Bans
Absinthe became associated with violent crimes and social disorder, and one modern writer claims that this trend was spurred by fabricated claims and smear campaigns, which he claims were orchestrated by the temperance movement and the wine industry. One critic claimed:

Edgar Degas's 1876 painting L'Absinthe can be seen at the Musée d'Orsay epitomising the popular view of absinthe addicts as sodden and benumbed, and Émile Zola described its effects in his novel L'Assommoir.

In 1905, Swiss farmer Jean Lanfray murdered his family and attempted to kill himself after drinking absinthe. Lanfray was an alcoholic who had drunk a lot of wine and brandy before the killings, but that was overlooked or ignored, and blame for the murders was placed solely on his consumption of two glasses of absinthe. The Lanfray murders were the tipping point in this hotly debated topic, and a subsequent petition collected more than 82,000 signatures to ban it in Switzerland. A referendum was held on 5 July 1908. It was approved by voters, and the prohibition of absinthe was written into the Swiss constitution.

In 1906, Belgium and Brazil banned the sale and distribution of absinthe, although these were not the first countries to take such action. It had been banned as early as 1898 in the colony of the Congo Free State. The Netherlands banned it in 1909, Switzerland in 1910, the United States in 1912, and France in 1914.

The prohibition of absinthe in France eventually led to the popularity of pastis, and to a lesser extent, ouzo, and other anise-flavoured spirits that do not contain wormwood. Following the conclusion of the First World War, production of the Pernod Fils brand was resumed at the Banus distillery in Catalonia, Spain (where absinthe was still legal), but gradually declining sales saw the cessation of production in the 1960s. In Switzerland, the ban served only to drive the production of absinthe underground. Clandestine home distillers produced colourless absinthe (la Bleue), which was easier to conceal from the authorities. Many countries never banned absinthe, notably the United Kingdom, where it had never been as popular as in continental Europe.

Modern revival

British importer BBH Spirits began to import Hill's Absinth from the Czech Republic in the 1990s, as the UK had never formally banned it, and this sparked a modern resurgence in its popularity. It began to reappear during a revival in the 1990s in countries where it was never banned. Forms of absinthe available during that time consisted almost exclusively of Czech, Spanish, and Portuguese brands that were of recent origin, typically consisting of Bohemian-style products. Connoisseurs considered these of inferior quality and not representative of the 19th-century spirit. In 2000, La Fée Absinthe became the first commercial absinthe distilled and bottled in France since the 1914 ban, but it is now one of dozens of brands that are produced and sold within France.

In the Netherlands, the restrictions were challenged by Amsterdam wineseller Menno Boorsma in July 2004, thus confirming the legality of absinthe once again. Similarly, Belgium lifted its long-standing ban on January 1, 2005, citing a conflict with the adopted food and beverage regulations of the single European Market. In Switzerland, the constitutional ban was repealed in 2000 during an overhaul of the national constitution, although the prohibition was written into ordinary law, instead. That law was later repealed, and it was made legal on March 1, 2005.

The drink was never officially banned in Spain, although it began to fall out of favour in the 1940s and almost vanished into obscurity. Catalonia has seen significant resurgence since 2007, when one producer established operations there. Absinthe has never been illegal to import or manufacture in Australia, although importation requires a permit under the Customs (Prohibited Imports) Regulation 1956 due to a restriction on importing any product containing "oil of wormwood". In 2000, an amendment made all wormwood species prohibited herbs for food purposes under Food Standard 1.4.4. Prohibited and Restricted Plants and Fungi. However, this amendment was found inconsistent with other parts of the pre-existing Food Code, and it was withdrawn in 2002 during the transition between the two codes, thereby continuing to allow absinthe manufacture and importation through the existing permit-based system. These events were erroneously reported by the media as it having been reclassified from a prohibited product to a restricted product.

In 2007, the French brand Lucid became the first genuine absinthe to receive a Certificate of Label Approval  for import into the United States since 1912, following independent efforts by representatives from Lucid and Kübler to overturn the long-standing U.S. ban. In December 2007, St. George Absinthe Verte produced by St. George Spirits of Alameda, California became the first brand of American-made absinthe produced in the United States since the ban. Since that time, other micro-distilleries have started producing small batches in the United States.

The 21st century has seen new types of absinthe, including various frozen preparations, which have become increasingly popular. The French Absinthe Ban of 1915 was repealed in May 2011 following petitions by the Fédération Française des Spiritueux which represents French distillers.

Production

Most countries have no legal definition for absinthe, whereas the method of production and content of spirits such as whisky, brandy, and gin are globally defined and regulated. Therefore, producers are at liberty to label a product as "absinthe" or "absinth" without regard to any specific legal definition or quality standards.

Producers of legitimate absinthes employ one of two historically defined processes to create the finished spirit – distillation or cold mixing. In the sole country (Switzerland) that does possess a legal definition of absinthe, distillation is the only permitted method of production.

Distilled absinthe
Distilled absinthe employs a method of production similar to that of high-quality gin. Botanicals are initially macerated in distilled base alcohol before being redistilled to exclude bitter principles, and impart the desired complexity and texture to the spirit.
The distillation of absinthe first yields a colourless distillate that leaves the alembic at around 72% ABV. The distillate may be reduced and bottled clear, to produce a Blanche or la Bleue absinthe, or it may be coloured to create a verte using natural or artificial colouring.

Traditional absinthes obtain their green color strictly from the chlorophyll of whole herbs, which is extracted from the plants during the secondary maceration. This step involves steeping plants such as petite wormwood, hyssop, and melissa (among other herbs) in the distillate. Chlorophyll from these herbs is extracted in the process, giving the drink its famous green color.

This step also provides an herbal complexity that is typical of high-quality absinthe. The natural coloring process is considered critical for absinthe ageing, since the chlorophyll remains chemically active. The chlorophyll serves a similar role in absinthe that tannins do in wine or brown liquors.

After the coloring process, the resulting product is diluted with water to the desired percentage of alcohol. The flavor of absinthe is said to improve materially with storage, and many distilleries, before the ban, aged their absinthe in settling tanks before bottling.

Cold mixed absinthe
Many modern absinthes are produced using a cold-mix process. This inexpensive method of production does not involve distillation, and is regarded as inferior for the same reasons that give cause for cheaply compounded gin to be legally differentiated from distilled gin.  The cold mixing process involves the simple blending of flavouring essences and artificial colouring in commercial alcohol, in similar fashion to most flavoured vodkas and inexpensive liqueurs and cordials. Some modern cold-mixed absinthes have been bottled at strengths approaching 90% ABV. Others are presented simply as a bottle of plain alcohol with a small amount of powdered herbs suspended within it.

The lack of a formal legal definition in most countries to regulate the production and quality of absinthe has enabled cheaply made products to be falsely presented as traditional in production and composition. In Switzerland, the only country with a formal legal definition of absinthe, any absinthe product not obtained by maceration and distillation or coloured artificially cannot be sold as absinthe.

Ingredients
Absinthe is traditionally prepared from a distillation of neutral alcohol, various herbs, spices, and water. Traditional absinthes were redistilled from a white grape spirit (or eau de vie), while lesser absinthes were more commonly made from alcohol from grains, beets, or potatoes. The principal botanicals are grande wormwood, green anise, and florence fennel, which are often called "the holy trinity". Many other herbs may be used as well, such as petite wormwood (Artemisia pontica or Roman wormwood), hyssop, melissa, star anise, angelica, peppermint, coriander, and veronica.

One early recipe was included in 1864's The English and Australian Cookery Book. It directed the maker to "Take of the tops of wormwood, four pounds; root of angelica, calamus aromaticus, aniseed, leaves of dittany, of each one ounce; alcohol, four gallons. Macerate these substances during eight days, add a little water, and distil by a gentle fire, until two gallons are obtained. This is reduced to a proof spirit, and a few drops of the oil of aniseed added."

Alternative colouring

Adding to absinthe's negative reputation in the late 19th and early 20th centuries, unscrupulous makers of the drink omitted the traditional colouring phase of production in favour of adding toxic copper salts to artificially induce a green tint. This practice may be responsible for some of the alleged toxicity historically associated with this beverage. Many modern-day producers resort to other shortcuts, including the use of artificial food coloring to create the green color. Additionally, at least some cheap absinthes produced before the ban were reportedly adulterated with poisonous antimony trichloride, reputed to enhance the louching effect.

Absinthe may also be naturally coloured pink or red using rose or hibiscus flowers. This was referred to as a rose (pink) or rouge (red) absinthe. Only one historical brand of rose absinthe has been documented.

Bottled strength

Absinthe was historically bottled at 45–74% ABV. Some modern Franco–Suisse absinthes are bottled at up to 83% ABV, while some modern, cold-mixed bohemian-style absinthes are bottled at up to 90% ABV.

Kits
The modern-day interest in absinthe has spawned a rash of absinthe kits from companies that claim they produce homemade absinthe. Kits often call for soaking herbs in vodka or alcohol, or adding a liquid concentrate to vodka or alcohol to create an ersatz absinthe. Such practices usually yield a harsh substance that bears little resemblance to the genuine article, and are considered inauthentic by any practical standard. Some concoctions may even be dangerous, especially if they call for supplementation with potentially poisonous herbs, oils and/or extracts. In at least one documented case, a person suffered acute kidney injury after drinking 10 ml of pure wormwood oila dose much higher than that found in absinthe.

Alternatives
In baking and in preparing the classic New Orleans-style Sazerac cocktail, anise-flavored liqueurs and pastis have often been used as a substitute if absinthe is unavailable.

Preparation

The traditional French preparation involves placing a sugar cube on top of a specially designed slotted spoon, and placing the spoon on a glass filled with a measure of absinthe. Iced water is poured or dripped over the sugar cube to mix the water into the absinthe. The final preparation contains 1 part absinthe and 3–5 parts water. As water dilutes the spirit, those components with poor water solubility (mainly those from anise, fennel, and star anise) come out of solution and cloud the drink. The resulting milky opalescence is called the louche (Fr. opaque or shady, IPA [luʃ]). The release of these dissolved essences coincides with a perfuming of herbal aromas and flavours that "blossom" or "bloom," and brings out subtleties that are otherwise muted within the neat spirit. This reflects what is perhaps the oldest and purest method of preparation, and is often referred to as the French Method.

The Bohemian method is a recent invention that involves fire, and was not performed during absinthe's peak of popularity in the Belle Époque. Like the French method, a sugar cube is placed on a slotted spoon over a glass containing one shot of absinthe. The sugar is soaked in alcohol (usually more absinthe), then set ablaze. The flaming sugar cube is then dropped into the glass, thus igniting the absinthe. Finally, a shot glass of water is added to douse the flames. This method tends to produce a stronger drink than the French method. A variant of the Bohemian method involves allowing the fire to extinguish on its own. This variant is sometimes referred to as "cooking the absinthe" or "the flaming green fairy". The origin of this burning ritual may borrow from a coffee and brandy drink that was served at Café Brûlot, in which a sugar cube soaked in brandy was set aflame. Most experienced absintheurs do not recommend the Bohemian Method and consider it a modern gimmick, as it can destroy the absinthe flavour and present a fire hazard due to the unusually high alcohol content present in absinthe.

In 19th century Parisian cafés, upon receiving an order for an absinthe, a waiter would present the patron with a dose of absinthe in a suitable glass, sugar, absinthe spoon, and a carafe of iced water. It was up to the patron to prepare the drink, as the inclusion or omission of sugar was strictly an individual preference, as was the amount of water used.  As the popularity of the drink increased, additional accoutrements of preparation appeared, including the absinthe fountain, which was effectively a large jar of iced water with spigots, mounted on a lamp base. This let drinkers prepare a number of drinks at onceand with a hands-free drip, patrons could socialise while louching a glass.

Although many bars served absinthe in standard glassware, a number of glasses were specifically designed for the French absinthe preparation ritual. Absinthe glasses were typically fashioned with a dose line, bulge, or bubble in the lower portion denoting how much absinthe should be poured. One "dose" of absinthe ranged anywhere around 2–2.5 fluid ounces (60–75 ml).

In addition to being prepared with sugar and water, absinthe emerged as a popular cocktail ingredient in both the United Kingdom and the United States.  By 1930, dozens of fancy cocktails that called for absinthe had been published in numerous credible bartender guides. One of the most famous of these libations is Ernest Hemingway's "Death in the Afternoon" cocktail, a tongue-in-cheek concoction that contributed to a 1935 collection of celebrity recipes. The directions are: "Pour one jigger absinthe into a Champagne glass. Add iced Champagne until it attains the proper opalescent milkiness. Drink three to five of these slowly."

Styles
Most categorical alcoholic beverages have regulations governing their classification and labelling, while those governing absinthe have always been conspicuously lacking. According to popular treatises from the 19th century, absinthe could be loosely categorised into several grades (ordinaire, demi-fine, fine, and Suissethe latter does not denote origin), in order of increasing alcoholic strength and quality. Many contemporary absinthe critics simply classify absinthe as distilled or mixed, according to its production method. And while the former is generally considered far superior in quality to the latter, an absinthe's simple claim of being 'distilled' makes no guarantee as to the quality of its base ingredients or the skill of its maker.

 Blanche absinthe ("white" in French, also referred to as la Bleue in Switzerland) is bottled directly following distillation and reduction, and is uncoloured (clear). Blanches tend to have a clean, smooth flavour with strongly individuated tasting notes. The name la Bleue was originally a term used for Swiss bootleg absinthe, which was bottled colourless so as to be visually indistinct from other spirits during the era of absinthe prohibition, but has become a popular term for post-ban Swiss-style absinthe in general. Blanches are often lower in alcohol content than vertes, though this is not necessarily so; the only truly differentiating factor is that blanches are not put through a secondary maceration stage, and thus remain colourless like other distilled liquors.
 Verte absinthe ("green" in French, sometimes called la fée verte) begins as a blanche, and is altered by a secondary maceration stage, in which a separate mixture of herbs is steeped into the clear distillate before bottling. This confers an intense, complex flavor as well as a peridot green hue. Vertes represent the prevailing type of absinthe that was found in the 19th century. Vertes are typically more alcoholic than blanches, as the high amounts of botanical oils conferred during the secondary maceration only remain miscible at lower concentrations of water, thus vertes are usually bottled at closer to still strength. Artificially colored green absinthes may also be claimed to be verte, though they lack the characteristic herbal flavors that result from maceration in whole herbs.
 Absenta ("absinthe" in Spanish) is sometimes associated with a regional style that often differed slightly from its French cousin. Traditional absentas may taste slightly different due to their use of Alicante anise, and often exhibit a characteristic citrus flavour.
 Hausgemacht (German for home-made, often abbreviated as HG) refers to clandestine absinthe (not be confused with the Swiss La Clandestine brand) that is home-distilled by hobbyists. It should not be confused with absinthe kits. Hausgemacht absinthe is produced in tiny quantities for personal use and not for the commercial market. Clandestine production increased after absinthe was banned, when small producers went underground, most notably in Switzerland. Although the ban has been lifted in Switzerland, some clandestine distillers have not legitimised their production. Authorities believe that high taxes on alcohol and the mystique of being underground are likely reasons.

 Bohemian-style absinth is also referred to as Czech-style absinthe, anise-free absinthe, or just "absinth" (without the "e"), and is best described as a wormwood bitters. It is produced mainly in the Czech Republic, from which it gets its designation as Bohemian or Czech, although not all absinthes from the Czech Republic are Bohemian-style. Bohemian-style absinth typically contains little or none of the anise, fennel, and other herbal flavours associated with traditional absinthe, and thus bears very little resemblance to the absinthes made popular in the 19th century. Typical Bohemian-style absinth has only two similarities with its authentic, traditional counterpart: it contains wormwood and has a high alcohol content. The Czechs are credited with inventing the fire ritual in the 1990s, possibly because Bohemian-style absinth does not louche, which renders the traditional French preparation method useless.  As such, this type of absinthe and the fire ritual associated with it are entirely modern fabrications, and have little to no relationship with the historical absinthe tradition.

Storage
Absinthe that is artificially coloured or clear is aesthetically stable, and can be bottled in clear glass. If naturally colored absinthe is exposed to light or air for a prolonged period, the chlorophyll gradually becomes oxidized, which has the effect of gradually changing the color from green to yellow green, and eventually to brown. The colour of absinthe that has completed this transition was historically referred to as feuille morte ("dead leaf"). In the pre-ban era, this natural phenomenon was favourably viewed, for it confirmed the product in question was coloured naturally, and not artificially with potentially toxic chemicals. Predictably, vintage absinthes often emerge from sealed bottles as distinctly amber in tint due to decades of slow oxidation.  Though this colour change presents no adverse impact to the flavour of absinthe, it is generally desired to preserve the original colour, which requires that naturally coloured absinthe be bottled in dark, light resistant bottles. Absinthe intended for decades of storage should be kept in a cool (room temperature), dry place, away from light and heat. Absinthe should not be stored in the refrigerator or freezer, as the anethole may polymerise inside the bottle, creating an irreversible precipitate, and adversely impacting the original flavour.

Health effects 
Absinthe has been frequently and improperly described in modern times as being hallucinogenic. No peer-reviewed scientific study has demonstrated absinthe to possess hallucinogenic properties. The belief that absinthe induces hallucinogenic effects is rooted, at least partly, in the findings of 19th century French psychiatrist Valentin Magnan, who carried out ten years of experiments with wormwood oil. In the course of this research he studied 250 cases of alcoholism and concluded that those who abused absinthe were worse off than those who abused other alcoholic drinks, experiencing rapid-onset hallucinations. Such accounts by opponents of absinthe (like Magnan) were cheerfully embraced by famous absinthe drinkers, many of whom were bohemian artists or writers.

Two famous artists who helped popularise the notion that absinthe had powerful psychoactive properties were Toulouse-Lautrec and Vincent van Gogh. In one of the best-known written accounts of absinthe drinking, an inebriated Oscar Wilde described a phantom sensation of having tulips brush against his legs after leaving a bar at closing time.

Notions of absinthe's alleged hallucinogenic properties were again fuelled in the 1970s, when a scientific paper suggested that thujone's structural similarity to tetrahydrocannabinol (THC), the active chemical in cannabis, presented the possibility of THC receptor affinity. This theory was conclusively disproven in 1999.

The debate over whether absinthe produces effects on the human mind in addition to those of alcohol has not been resolved conclusively. The effects of absinthe have been described by some as mind opening. The most commonly reported experience is a "clear-headed" feeling of inebriationa form of "lucid drunkenness". Chemist, historian and absinthe distiller Ted Breaux has claimed that the alleged secondary effects of absinthe may be because some of the herbal compounds in the drink act as stimulants, while others act as sedatives, creating an overall lucid effect of awakening. The long-term effects of moderate absinthe consumption in humans remain unknown, although herbs traditionally used to produce absinthe are reported to have both painkilling and antiparasitic properties.

Today it is known that absinthe does not cause hallucinations.  It is widely accepted that reports of hallucinogenic effects resulting from absinthe consumption were attributable to the poisonous adulterants being added to cheaper versions of the drink in the 19th century, such as oil of wormwood, impure alcohol (contaminated possibly with methanol), and poisonous colouring matter – notably (among other green copper salts) cupric acetate and antimony trichloride (the last-named being used to fake the ouzo effect).

Controversy 
It was once widely promoted that excessive absinthe drinking caused effects that were discernible from those associated with alcoholism, a belief that led to the coining of the term absinthism. One of the first vilifications of absinthe followed an 1864 experiment in which Magnan simultaneously exposed one guinea pig to large doses of pure wormwood vapour, and another to alcohol vapours. The guinea pig exposed to wormwood vapour experienced convulsive seizures, while the animal exposed to alcohol did not. Magnan would later blame the naturally occurring (in wormwood) chemical thujone for these effects.

Thujone, once widely believed to be an active chemical in absinthe, is a GABA antagonist, and while it can produce muscle spasms in large doses, there is no direct evidence to suggest it causes hallucinations. Past reports estimated thujone concentrations in absinthe as being up to 260 mg/kg. More recently, published scientific analyses of samples of various original absinthes have disproved previous estimates, and demonstrated that only a trace of the thujone present in wormwood actually makes it into a properly distilled absinthe when historical methods and materials are employed to create the spirit.  As such, most traditionally crafted absinthes, both vintage and modern, fall within the current EU standards.

Tests conducted on mice to study toxicity showed an oral  of about 45 mg thujone per kg of body weight, which represents far more absinthe than could be realistically consumed. The high percentage of alcohol in absinthe would result in mortality long before thujone could become a factor. In documented cases of acute thujone poisoning as a result of oral ingestion, the source of thujone was not commercial absinthe, but rather non-absinthe-related sources, such as common essential oils (which may contain as much as 50% thujone).

One study published in the Journal of Studies on Alcohol concluded that high doses (0.28 mg/kg) of thujone in alcohol had negative effects on attention performance in a clinical setting. It delayed reaction time, and caused subjects to concentrate their attention into the central field of vision. Low doses (0.028 mg/kg) did not produce an effect noticeably different from the plain alcohol control. While the effects of the high dose samples were statistically significant in a double blind test, the test subjects themselves were unable to reliably identify which samples contained thujone. For the average  man, the high dose samples in the study would equate to 18.2 mg of thujone. The EU limit of 35 mg/L of thujone in absinthe means that given the highest permitted thujone content, that individual would need to consume approximately 0.5 litres of high proof (e.g. 50%+ ABV) spirit before the thujone could be metabolized in order to display effects detectable in a clinical setting, which would result in a potentially lethal BAC of >0.4%.

Regulations
Most countries (except Switzerland) at present do not possess a legal definition of absinthe (unlike Scotch whisky or cognac). Accordingly, producers are free to label a product "absinthe" or "absinth", whether or not it bears any resemblance to the traditional spirit.

Australia
Absinthe is readily available in many bottle shops. Bitters may contain a maximum 35 mg/kg thujone, while other alcoholic beverages can contain a maximum 10 mg/kg.  The domestic production and sale of absinthe is regulated by state licensing laws.

Until July 13, 2013, the import and sale of absinthe technically required a special permit, since "oil of wormwood, being an essential oil obtained from plants of the genus Artemisia, and preparations containing oil of wormwood" were listed as item 12A, Schedule 8, Regulation 5H of the Customs (Prohibited Imports) Regulations 1956 (Cth).  These controls have now been repealed, and permission is no longer required.

Brazil
Absinthe was prohibited in Brazil until 1999 and was brought by entrepreneur Lalo Zanini and legalised in the same year. Presently, absinthe sold in Brazil must abide by the national law that restricts all spirits to a maximum of 54% ABV. While this regulation is enforced throughout channels of legal distribution, it may be possible to find absinthe containing alcohol in excess of the legal limit in some restaurants or food fairs.

Canada
In Canada, liquor laws concerning the production, distribution, and sale of spirits are written and enforced by individual provincial government monopolies. Each product is subject to the approval of a respective individual provincial liquor board before it can be sold in that province. Importation is a federal matter, and is enforced by the Canada Border Services Agency. The importation of a nominal amount of liquor by individuals for personal use is permitted, provided that conditions for the individual's duration of stay outside the country are satisfied.
 British Columbia, New Brunswick: no established limits on thujone content
 Alberta, Ontario: 10 mg/kg
 Manitoba: 6–8 mg
 Quebec: 15 mg/kg
 Newfoundland and Labrador: absinthe sold in provincial liquor store outlets
 Nova Scotia: absinthe sold in provincial liquor store outlets
 Prince Edward Island: absinthe is not sold in provincial liquor store outlets, but one brand (Deep Roots) produced on the island can be procured locally.
 Saskatchewan: Only one brand listed in provincial liquor stores, although an individual is permitted to import one case (usually twelve 750 ml bottles or eight one-litre bottles) of any liquor.
 Ontario: 3 brands of absinthe are listed for sale on the web site of the Liquor Control Board of Ontario

In 2007, Canada's first genuine absinthe (Taboo Absinthe) was created by Okanagan Spirits Craft Distillery in British Columbia.

European Union
The European Union permits a maximum thujone level of 35 mg/kg in alcoholic beverages where Artemisia species is a listed ingredient, and 10 mg/kg in other alcoholic beverages. Member countries regulate absinthe production within this framework. The sale of absinthe is permitted in all EU countries unless they further regulate it.

Finland
The sale and production of absinthe was prohibited in Finland from 1919 to 1932; no current prohibitions exist. The government-owned chain of liquor stores (Alko) is the only outlet that may sell alcoholic beverages containing over 5.5% ABV, although national law bans the sale of alcoholic beverages containing over 80% ABV.

France

Édouard Manet's first major painting The Absinthe Drinker was controversial, and was rejected by the Paris Salon in 1859.  Despite adopting sweeping EU food and beverage regulations in 1988 that effectively re-legalised absinthe, a decree was passed that same year that preserved the prohibition on products explicitly labelled as "absinthe", while placing strict limits on fenchone (fennel) and pinocamphone (hyssop) in an obvious, but failed, attempt to thwart a possible return of absinthe-like products.  French producers circumvented this regulatory obstacle by labelling absinthe as spiritueux à base de plantes d'absinthe ('wormwood-based spirits'), with many either reducing or omitting fennel and hyssop altogether from their products.  A legal challenge to the scientific basis of this decree resulted in its repeal (2009), which opened the door for the official French re-legalisation of absinthe for the first time since 1915.  The French Senate voted to repeal the prohibition in mid-April 2011.

Georgia
It is legal to produce and sell absinthe in Georgia, which has claimed to possess several producers of absinthe.

Germany
A ban on absinthe was enacted in Germany on 27 March 1923. In addition to banning the production of and commercial trade in absinthe, the law went so far as to prohibit the distribution of printed matter that provided details of its production. The original ban was lifted in 1981, but the use of Artemisia absinthium as a flavouring agent remained prohibited. On 27 September 1991, Germany adopted the European Union's standards of 1988, which effectively re-legalised absinthe.

Italy
The Fascist regime in 1926 banned the production, import, transport and sale of any liquor named "Assenzio". The ban was reinforced in 1931 with harsher penalties for transgressors, and remained in force until 1992 when the Italian government amended its laws to comply with the EU directive 88/388/EEC.

New Zealand
Although absinthe is not prohibited at national level,  some local authorities have banned it. The latest is Mataura in Southland. The ban came in August 2008 after several issues of misuse drew public and police attention. One incident resulted in breathing difficulties and hospitalising of a 17-year-old for alcohol poisoning. The particular brand of absinthe that caused these effects was bottled at 89% ABV.

Sweden and Norway
The sale and production of absinthe has never been prohibited in Sweden or Norway. However, the only outlet that may sell alcoholic beverages containing more than 3.5% ABV in Sweden and 4.75% ABV in Norway, is the government-owned chain of liquor stores known as Systembolaget in Sweden and Vinmonopolet in Norway. Systembolaget and Vinmonopolet did not import or sell absinthe for many years after the ban in France; however, today several absinthes are available for purchase in Systembolaget stores, including Swedish made distilled absinthe. In Norway, on the other hand, one is less likely to find many absinthes since Norwegian alcohol law prohibits the sale and importation of alcoholic beverages above 60% ABV, which eliminates most absinthes.

Switzerland
In Switzerland, the sale and production of absinthe was prohibited from 1910 to March 1, 2005. This was based on a vote in 1908. To be legally made or sold in Switzerland, absinthe must be distilled, must not contain certain additives, and must be either naturally coloured or left uncoloured.

In 2014, the Federal Administrative Court of Switzerland invalidated a governmental decision of 2010 which allowed only absinthe made in the Val-de-Travers region to be labelled as absinthe in Switzerland. The court found that absinthe was a label for a product and was not tied to a geographic origin.

United States

In 2007, the Alcohol and Tobacco Tax and Trade Bureau (TTB) effectively lifted the long-standing absinthe ban, and it has since approved many brands for sale in the US market. This was made possible partly through the TTB's clarification of the Food and Drug Administration's (FDA) thujone content regulations, which specify that finished food and beverages that contain Artemisia species must be thujone-free. In this context, the TTB considers a product thujone-free if the thujone content is less than 10 ppm (equal to 10 mg/kg). This is verified through the use of gas chromatography–mass spectrometry. The brands Kübler and Lucid and their lawyers did most of the work to get absinthe legalized in the U.S., over the 2004–2007 time period. In the U.S., March 5 sometimes is referred to as "National Absinthe Day", as it was the day the 95-year ban on absinthe was finally lifted.

The import, distribution, and sale of absinthe are permitted subject to the following restrictions:
 The product must be thujone-free as per TTB guidelines,
 The word "absinthe" can neither be the brand name nor stand alone on the label, and
 The packaging cannot "project images of hallucinogenic, psychotropic, or mind-altering effects."

Absinthe imported in violation of these regulations is subject to seizure at the discretion of U.S. Customs and Border Protection.

Beginning in 2000, a product called Absente was sold legally in the United States under the marketing tagline "Absinthe Refined," but as the product contained sugar, and was made with southernwood (Artemisia abrotanum) and not grande wormwood (Artemisia absinthium) (before 2009), the TTB classified it as a liqueur.

Vanuatu
The Absinthe (Prohibition) Act 1915, passed in the New Hebrides, has never been repealed, is included in the 2006 Vanuatu consolidated legislation, and contains the following all-encompassing restriction: "The manufacture, importation, circulation and sale wholesale or by retail of absinthe or similar liquors in Vanuatu shall be prohibited."

Cultural influence

Numerous artists and writers living in France in the late 19th and early 20th centuries were noted absinthe drinkers and featured absinthe in their work. Some of these included Édouard Manet, Guy de Maupassant, Paul Verlaine, Amedeo Modigliani, Edgar Degas, Henri de Toulouse-Lautrec, Vincent van Gogh, Oscar Wilde, Arthur Rimbaud, and Émile Zola. Many other renowned artists and writers similarly drew from this cultural well, including Aleister Crowley, Ernest Hemingway, Pablo Picasso, August Strindberg, and Erik Satie.

The aura of illicitness and mystery surrounding absinthe has played into literature, movies, music, and television, where it is often portrayed as a mysterious, addictive, and mind-altering drink. Marie Corelli's Wormwood: A Drama of Paris (1890) was a popular novel about a Frenchman driven to murder and ruin after being introduced to absinthe. Intended as a morality tale on the dangers of the drink, it was speculated to have contributed to subsequent bans of absinthe in Europe and the United States.
Some of the earliest film references include The Hasher's Delirium (1910) by Émile Cohl, an early pioneer in the art of animation, as well as two different silent films, each entitled Absinthe, from 1913 and 1914 respectively.

See also
 List of alcoholic drinks

References

Further reading
 Adams, Jad (2004) Hideous absinthe: a history of the devil in a bottle, London: I.B. Tauris.

External links

 "Absinthe's second coming" An April 2001 article in Cigar Aficionado about the first absinthe commercially produced in France since the 1915 ban.
 "Swiss face sobering future after legalizing absinthe" A March 2005 Reuters article about the legalising of absinthe in Switzerland.
 "The Mystery of the Green Menace"A November 2005 Wired magazine article about a New Orleans man who has researched the chemical content of absinthe and now distills it in France
 "The Return of the Green Faerie"A wine and spirit journal article about the history, ritual, and artistic cult of absinthe
 The Wormwood Society An independent organisation supporting changes to the US laws and regulations concerning absinthe. Provides articles, a forum and legal information.
 "What Is Absinthe"Article discussing absinthe and its effect over mind and body.
 

 
Anise liqueurs and spirits
Culinary Heritage of Switzerland
Distilled drinks
French distilled drinks